Mario Sanchez (born January 28, 1975) is an American soccer coach and former player who was most recently the interim head coach of Racing Louisville FC and the youth academy director for both Louisville City FC and Racing Louisville FC. He is the former head coach of Louisville City U-23, the SIUE Cougars men's soccer team, and the UNLV Rebels men's soccer team.

Sanchez played professionally in the USISL and USL A-League, winning the 1996 and 1997 USISL championship with the Central Coast Roadrunners.

Early life
Sanchez graduated from Etiwanda High School in 1993. He played soccer for the Alta Loma Soccer Club which won the 1992 U-17 National Championship. He attended the California State University, Fresno, playing on the men's soccer team from 1993 to 1997. In August 1996, he tore his anterior cruciate ligament in practice and lost the season. He returned in 1997 for his senior season and graduated in 1999 with a bachelor's degree in business administration.

Club career
In 1996 and 1997, Sanchez spent the collegiate off-season with the Central Coast Roadrunners of the USISL. Sanchez and his teammates won the USISL championship both seasons.

On February 1, 1998, the Kansas City Wizards selected Sanchez in the third round (thirty-second overall) of the 1998 MLS College Draft. The Wizards released him in the pre-season and he signed with the Orange County Zodiac of the USL A-League. Sanchez began the 1999 season with the Zodiac, but left in July when Fresno State hired him as an assistant coach. In 2001, he returned to playing with the Stanislaus County Cruisers.

Coaching career
In June 1999, Northwood High School hired Sanchez to coach its boys’ soccer team. He resigned two months later to become an assistant coach with the Fresno State Bulldogs men's soccer team. Fresno State dropped its men's soccer program after the 2003 season and Sanchez moved to the Akron Zips.

In 2006, UNLV hired Sanchez as head coach of the men's soccer program. Following UNLV's first winning season in eight years, Sanchez resigned on February 5, 2010, moving to the Louisville Cardinals, where he was an assistant coach and associate head coach 2011–2015.

On January 27, 2015, Sanchez was named the head coach of the SIU Edwardsville Cougars men's soccer team.

On November 30, 2018, Sanchez resigned to accept the position of Director of Youth Development and Community Relations for Louisville City FC of the United Soccer League.

Collegiate record

Personal life
Sanchez earned a bachelor's in business administration from Fresno State. He holds a U.S. Soccer Federation 'A' License.

Sanchez is married to the former Shana Stickel. The couple has four children: sons Sebastian and Santiago, and daughters Ella and Emme.

References

External links
 UNLV Runnin Rebels bio

1975 births
Living people
American soccer coaches
American soccer players
Central Coast Roadrunners players
Soccer players from California
Fresno State Bulldogs men's soccer players
Orange County Blue Star players
Stanislaus County Cruisers players
SIU Edwardsville Cougars men's soccer coaches
UNLV Rebels men's soccer coaches
USL League Two players
A-League (1995–2004) players
Sporting Kansas City draft picks
USL Second Division players
Association football midfielders
Akron Zips men's soccer coaches
Fresno State Bulldogs men's soccer coaches
Louisville Cardinals men's soccer coaches
People from Rancho Cucamonga, California
Sportspeople from San Bernardino County, California
USL League Two coaches
Racing Louisville FC coaches
National Women's Soccer League coaches